Cytheromatidae is a family of crustaceans belonging to the order Podocopida.

Genera:
 Afghanistina Hu & Tao, 2008
 Cytheroma Mueller, 1894
 Fernandinacythere Gottwald, 1983
 Luvula Coryell & Fields, 1937
 Megacythere Puri, 1960
 Microloxoconcha Hartmann, 1954
 Paracytheroma Juday, 1907
 Pellucistoma Coryell & Fields, 1937
 Pontocytheroma Marinov, 1963

References

Ostracods